Hippolyte Désiré Metdepenningen (1799–1881) was a Belgian lawyer, president of the Ghent Bar Association and a politician.

After Belgium became independent from the Netherlands in 1830 he became a municipal councilor on the Orangist list. In 1846 he was co-founder of the Liberal Party, which was the first political party of Belgium. In 1848 he retired from politics. For many years he was Worshipful Master of the Ghent lodge Le Septentrion. On 20 June 1886, a statue was inaugurated in front of the Court of Justice in Ghent by sculptor Julien Dillens.

External links

 Hippolyte Metdepenningen 

Politicians from Ghent

19th-century Belgian lawyers
1799 births
1881 deaths
Jurists from Ghent